The Canton of Givors is a French former administrative division. It was disbanded at the creation of the Metropolis of Lyon in January 2015. It was located in the arrondissement of Lyon, in the Rhône département (Rhône-Alpes région). It had 40,828 inhabitants in 2012.

Composition 
The canton comprised the following communes:

Chassagny
Échalas
Givors
Grigny
Millery
Montagny
Saint-Andéol-le-Château
Saint-Jean-de-Touslas
Saint-Romain-en-Gier

See also
Cantons of the Rhône department
Communes of the Rhône department

References

Former cantons of Rhône (department)